Bryconamericus is a genus of characins found in Central and South America.

Species
There are currently 57 recognized species in this genus:
 Bryconamericus agna Azpelicueta & Almirón, 2001
 Bryconamericus alfredae C. H. Eigenmann, 1927 
 Bryconamericus andresoi Román-Valencia, 2003 
 Bryconamericus arilepis Román-Valencia, Vanegas-Ríos & Ruiz-C., 2008 
 Bryconamericus bolivianus N. E. Pearson, 1924 
 Bryconamericus bucayensis Román-Valencia, Ruiz-C., Taphorn & García-Alzate, 2013 
 Bryconamericus caldasi Román-Valencia, Ruiz-C., Taphorn & García-Alzate, 2014 
 Bryconamericus carlosi Román-Valencia, 2003 
 Bryconamericus charalae Román-Valencia, 2005 
 Bryconamericus cismontanus C. H. Eigenmann, 1914 
 Bryconamericus diaphanus (Cope, 1878) 
 Bryconamericus ecai J. F. P. da Silva, 2004
 Bryconamericus eigenmanni (Evermann & Kendall, 1906)
 Bryconamericus exodon C. H. Eigenmann, 1907
 Bryconamericus foncensis Román-Valencia, Vanegas-Ríos & Ruiz-C., 2009 
 Bryconamericus grosvenori C. H. Eigenmann, 1927 
 Bryconamericus guizae Román-Valencia, 2003 
 Bryconamericus guyanensis Zarske, Le Bail & Géry, 2010 
 Bryconamericus huilae Román-Valencia, 2003 
 Bryconamericus hyphesson C. H. Eigenmann, 1909 
 Bryconamericus icelus Dahl, 1964 
 Bryconamericus ichoensis Román-Valencia, 2000 
 Bryconamericus iheringii (Boulenger, 1887)
 Bryconamericus ikaa Casciotta, Almirón & Azpelicueta, 2004
 Bryconamericus indefessus (Mirande, G. Aguilera & Azpelicueta, 2004) 
 Bryconamericus lambari L. R. Malabarba & Kindel, 1995
 Bryconamericus lassorum Román-Valencia, 2002 
 Bryconamericus leptorhynchus (J. F. P. da Silva & L. R. Malabarba, 1996) 
 Bryconamericus lethostigmus (A. L. Gomes, 1947) 
 Bryconamericus macarenae Román-Valencia, García-Alzate, Ruiz-C. & Taphorn, 2010 
 Bryconamericus macrophthalmus Román-Valencia, 2003 
 Bryconamericus megalepis Fowler, 1941 
 Bryconamericus mennii Miquelarena, Protogino, Filiberto & H. L. López, 2002
 Bryconamericus microcephalus (A. Miranda-Ribeiro, 1908)
 Bryconamericus motatanensis L. P. Schultz, 1944 
 Bryconamericus multiradiatus Dahl, 1960 
 Bryconamericus novae C. H. Eigenmann & Henn, 1914 
 Bryconamericus orinocoense Román-Valencia, 2003 
 Bryconamericus ornaticeps Bizerril & Peres-Neto, 1995
 Bryconamericus oroensis Román-Valencia, Ruiz-C., Taphorn & García-Alzate, 2013 
 Bryconamericus osgoodi C. H. Eigenmann & W. R. Allen, 1942 
 Bryconamericus pachacuti C. H. Eigenmann, 1927 
 Bryconamericus patriciae J. F. P. da Silva, 2004
 Bryconamericus phoenicopterus (Cope, 1872) 
 Bryconamericus pinnavittatus D'Agosta & Netto-Ferreira, 2015 
 Bryconamericus pyahu Azpelicueta, Casciotta & Almirón, 2003
 Bryconamericus rubropictus (C. Berg, 1901)
 Bryconamericus singularis Román-Valencia, Taphorn & Ruiz-C., 2008 
 Bryconamericus subtilisform Román-Valencia, 2003 
 Bryconamericus sylvicola Braga, 1998
 Bryconamericus tenuis Bizerril & P. M. C. Araújo, 1992
 Bryconamericus tolimae C. H. Eigenmann, 1913 
 Bryconamericus turiuba Langeani, Z. M. S. de Lucena, Pedrini & Tarelho-Pereira, 2005
 Bryconamericus uporas Casciotta, Azpelicueta & Almirón, 2002
 Bryconamericus yokiae Román-Valencia, 2003 
 Bryconamericus ytu Almirón, Azpelicueta & Casciotta, 2004
 Bryconamericus zamorensis Román-Valencia, Ruiz-C., Taphorn & García-Alzate, 2013

References

Characidae